Lost Children is a 2005 documentary film by Ali Samadi Ahadi and Oliver Stoltz about Military use of children in civil war in northern Uganda.

The film premiered in February 2005 at the Berlin International Film Festival, where it received the third place at PANORAMA Audience Award. The film was awarded in October 2005, the UNICEF Prize and the Youth Award and ran for more than two dozen international film festivals. Lost Children was nominated for Deutschen Kamerapreis Köln Award in 2005 for Best Documentary and Deutscher Filmpreis in 2006 in the documentary category.

References

External links 
 lost-children.de Official website
 
 LOST CHILDREN, Brooklyn Film Festival

Documentary films about child soldiers
2005 films
German documentary films
Documentary films about Uganda
2005 documentary films
Films directed by Ali Samadi Ahadi
2000s German films